is a passenger railway station located in the city of Sagamihara, Kanagawa, Japan, and operated by the private railway operator Odakyu Electric Railway.

Lines
The station is located on the border of Sagamihara with the city of Zama.

Station layout
Odakyū-Sagamihara Station has two side platforms serving two tracks, connected to the station building by footbridges. The station building is elevated, and is located above the tracks and platforms.

Platforms

History
The station first opened on 1 March 1938, as Sagamihara Station. It was renamed Odakyu-Sagamihara Station on 5 April 1941.

Station numbering was introduced in January 2014 with Odakyu-Sagamihara being assigned station number OH29.

Passenger statistics
In fiscal 2019, the station was used by an average of 57,496 passengers daily.

The passenger figures for previous years are as shown below.

Surrounding area
Sagamidai Town Development Center / Sagamidai Public Hall
Zama Post Office

See also
 List of railway stations in Japan

References

External links

 Odakyu station information 

Railway stations in Japan opened in 1938
Odakyu Odawara Line
Railway stations in Kanagawa Prefecture
Railway stations in Sagamihara